Joshua Michael Peck (born November 10, 1986) is an American actor and comedian. Peck began his career as a child actor in the late 1990s and early 2000s, and had an early role on the Nickelodeon sitcom The Amanda Show from 2000 to 2002. Peck rose to prominence for his role as Josh Nichols alongside Drake Bell's character on Nickelodeon's Drake & Josh from 2004 to 2007, and in its two television films, Drake & Josh Go Hollywood (2006) and Merry Christmas, Drake & Josh (2008). He then acted in films such as Mean Creek (2004), Drillbit Taylor (2008), The Wackness (2008), ATM (2012), Red Dawn (2012), Battle of the Year (2013), Danny Collins (2015), and Take the 10 (2017) and played the main role in the Disney+ original series Turner & Hooch, a continuation of the 1989 movie of the same name. Peck provided the voice of Eddie in the Ice Age franchise since Ice Age: The Meltdown (2006), and voiced Casey Jones in the Nickelodeon animated series Teenage Mutant Ninja Turtles (2012–2017). He also starred with John Stamos in the Fox comedy series Grandfathered (2015–2016). In 2017, Peck started a comedic lifestyle YouTube channel, Shua Vlogs, featuring his wife Paige O'Brien, David Dobrik, and many of the vlogsquad members.

Early life

Peck was born in New York City, He grew up with his mother, Barbara Peck, who is a career coach, and his maternal grandmother. Peck never met his father prior to his death in 2013, who was a married co-worker of his mother and Peck's birth was the result of an extramarital affair. Peck is Jewish, as are both his parents. He grew up in Hell's Kitchen, Manhattan, and attended P.S. 40 and The Professional Performing Arts School. He had a bar mitzvah ceremony. He had asthma during his childhood, and often stayed indoors watching old sitcoms. He was inspired to become involved in stand-up comedy when he was eight years old.

Career

Peck subsequently appeared at TADA! Youth Theater and performed stand-up comedy at Carolines on Broadway for the Audrey Hepburn foundation. He appeared on The Rosie O'Donnell Show at the age of 10 in 1996. At the age of 13, he was offered a role on Nickelodeon's The Amanda Show and, at his mother's suggestion, accepted the part and moved to Los Angeles to further pursue an acting career.

Peck made his film debut in Snow Day (2000), and appeared regularly on The Amanda Show until the end of its run in 2002. He also starred opposite Alex D. Linz and Zena Grey in the theatrical film, Max Keeble's Big Move, which was released on October 5, 2001. In 2001, he guest starred in an episode of the NBC drama ER called "Thy Will Be Done". During this period, Peck appeared in several independent films, including Spun and 2004's Mean Creek, for which he received critical praise. He was cast as Josh Nichols, opposite Drake Bell's Drake Parker, in another Nickelodeon sitcom, Drake & Josh, which began airing in 2004 and gained Peck recognition among young audiences. Peck's character, Josh Nichols, was smart, funny, and organized, but was always being tormented along with Drake by Megan Parker (Miranda Cosgrove), Drake's younger sister. Both characters sing in a remake of the song "Soul Man" by Sam and Dave. In 2006, Bell and Peck starred in their own TV movie called Drake & Josh Go Hollywood, and in 2007, they starred in a sequel called Drake & Josh: Really Big Shrimp. Josh was nominated for Favorite Television Actor at the 2008 Nickelodeon Kids' Choice Awards for his work on Drake & Josh. Peck also made his debut as a director in the Drake & Josh episode, "Battle of Panthatar". He also directed his co-star Drake Bell's music video for the theme song to Drake & Josh, "Found a Way". He has also appeared in the series finale of What's New, Scooby-Doo?, an episode of Codename: Kids Next Door called "Operation: C.A.K.E.D.-F.I.V.E.", and the direct-to-video New Line Cinema film Havoc. Peck returned to the character of Josh Nichols in 2008 for the television film Merry Christmas, Drake & Josh.In 2006, Peck appeared in the independent film Special, which premiered at the Sundance Film Festival, and voiced Eddie, one of two possum brothers, in the animated sequel, Ice Age: The Meltdown, which was released on March 31 of that year. Peck played a high school bully in 2008's Drillbit Taylor, and starred in the films The Wackness (released July 2008), American Primitive, Safety Glass, and reprised his role as Eddie in Ice Age: Dawn of the Dinosaurs. In 2011, Peck had a cameo role on the hit Nickelodeon show Victorious as an audience member for a play Jade wrote. In 2012, Peck starred in the remake of Red Dawn, and once again reprised his role as Eddie, in Ice Age: Continental Drift. In 2013, he began voicing Casey Jones in Nickelodeon's Teenage Mutant Ninja Turtles.
In 2014, Peck appeared as Danny Norwood in the pilot of The Rebels, one of Amazon Studios' five adult test pilots released on Amazon Video in early 2014.

In 2015, Peck was cast as a lead in the comedy series, Grandfathered, starring alongside John Stamos. Grandfathered premiered on September 29 and has gained generally favorable reviews from Rotten Tomatoes and Metacritic. Both Peck and Stamos are nominated for a 2016 People's Choice Award in the category "Favorite Actor In A New TV Series". However it was canceled after one season.

In 2016, Peck was cast as Ross in the FOX series Pitch. He appeared in 2 episodes as a statistics analyst. The series was cancelled after 10 episodes.

Peck made several features on David Dobrik's vlog, becoming a frequent contributor to "The Vlog Squad", before pursuing his own YouTube channel. Peck is an active Influencer on Instagram, YouTube and TikTok with 10.3m, 3.76m and 1.9m followers respectively.

Peck also currently has a podcast called "Curious with Josh Peck" produced by Ramble, where he interviews celebrities such as John Stamos and Bob Saget discussing not only current topics but their personal lives.

In February 2020, it was announced that Peck had been cast in the title role as U.S. Marshal Scott Turner II in the sequel series of Turner & Hooch on Disney+. The series premiered in July 2021, and after one season was canceled in December.

In August 2021, Peck joined the cast of How I Met Your Father as Drew, an elementary school vice principal. The series premiered on Hulu on January 18, 2022. He appears in two episodes of the second season of the iCarly revival, debuting in "iBuild a Team".

In March 2022, HarperOne released his memoir titled Happy People Are Annoying.

Personal life
In the fourth season of Drake & Josh, Peck was noticeably thinner. He said: "I made a conscious effort to lose weight because I knew I could be happier as well as being healthier. I started by going on a diet a year and a half ago and I got a personal trainer, but I definitely have a healthier lifestyle now. Also I feel that because I do so much television, I am a better role model. I don't really understand why I should be a role model, but I know that kids do look up to me, so it is my responsibility to motivate people and be inspiring. I hope that I can do that for kids. It doesn't really matter what you look like though."

In June 2017, Peck married his longtime girlfriend, Paige O'Brien. In August 2018, the couple announced they were expecting their first child. Their son was born that December. On October 13, 2022, they welcomed their second child.

Peck has named Ben Kingsley as his favorite actor, stating "Nobody is as good as him in my opinion".

In 2022, Peck revealed that he had struggled with addictions to alcohol and drugs in the past, stating, "I was always looking for something to fix my insides. But eventually I realized that whether my life was beyond my wildest dreams or a total mess, it didn't change the temperature of what was going on in my mind. I knew that nothing in the outside world would make me feel whole. . . . I used food and drugs to numb my feelings." He has been sober since 2008.

Filmography

Film

Television

Video games

Awards and nominations

References

External links

 
 
 Interview on "The Wackness" (alongside director Jonathan Levine) at IFC.com

1986 births
Living people
20th-century American comedians
20th-century American Jews
20th-century American male actors
21st-century American comedians
21st-century American Jews
21st-century American male actors
American male child actors
American male comedians
American male film actors
American male television actors
American male voice actors
American music video directors
American television directors
American YouTubers
Comedians from New York (state)
Comedians from New York City
Jewish American male actors
Jewish American male comedians
Male actors from New York (state)
Male actors from New York City
People from Hell's Kitchen, Manhattan
Vine (service) celebrities
YouTube channels launched in 2017